Tamnavulin distillery is a producer of single malt Scotch whisky that was founded in 1966.

The distillery is operated by Whyte & Mackay, which Philippines-based Alliance Global owns.

History
In 1966, Tamnavulin-Glenlivet Distillery Co. Ltd. built the Tamnavulin distillery in order to satisfy the growing demand from whisky blenders such as Whyte & Mackay, Crawfords, and Mackinlay's. In 1993, Whyte & Mackay became the owners of Tamnavulin when the company purchased Invergordon Distillers (the parent company of the Tamnavulin-Glenlivet Distillery Co. Ltd.) The purchase price of £382 million also included the distilleries Bruichladdich, Isle of Jura, and Tullibardine. The Tamnavulin distillery was closed in May 1995.

Ownership was transferred to Kyndal International in 2001, and then to the United Spirits division of United Breweries Group in 2007, operated by Whyte & Mackay. The distillery began operating once again in July 2007 after a major refurbishment with new automation and process control which was installed by Canongate Technology. Tamnavulin is now owned by Alliance Global, who purchased Whyte & Mackay in 2014 for £430m. Along with Invergordon distillery, it produces whisky for the company's blended Scotch whisky brands.

Operation
With its nine washbacks and six stills, Tamnavulin is sufficiently equipped with modern distilling technology to produce up to 4.3 million litres of alcohol per year. The distillation water supply comes from natural underground springs.

The Distillery does not currently have a visitor centre and is closed to the public

Products
In 2016, Tamnavulin was re-launched in the UK as a single malt to mark the 50th anniversary of the distillery. In 2019, a Sherry finish was launched, and in 2020 three red wine cask finishes were launched, a French Cabernet Sauvignon, a Spanish Grenache and a German Pinot Noir. A Tempranillo wine cask finish was also produced for sale in Global Travel Retail.
In 2021 an American Cabernet Sauvignon cask finish was added to the red wine series
In 2022 a white wine cask finish, Sauvignon Blanc was launched

Tamnavulin is the fastest growing single malt in the world

References

External links

Tamnavulinwhisky.com
Scotch Whisky
Whisky Distilleries
Malt Madness 

Distilleries in Scotland
Scottish malt whisky
1966 establishments in Scotland
Companies based in Moray